The Duchess of Cleveland may relate to:

People
Barbara Palmer, 1st Duchess of Cleveland (1640-1709), mistress of King Charles II of England.
Wilhelmina, Duchess of Cleveland, (Catherine Lucy) Wilhelmina Powlett, Duchess of Cleveland (née Stanhope) (1819-1901), English historian and genealogist.